10000 lépés (literal translation: 10,000 steps) is the second album by the Hungarian rock band Omega. It was released in 1969.

Track listing

Line-up/Musicians
 János Kóbor / lead vocals
 Gábor Presser / keyboards, backing vocals, lead vocal (B2, B3)
 Laszlo Benkő / keyboards, trumpet, backing vocals
 Tamas Mihály / bass, backing vocal, lead vocal (B4)
 György Molnár / guitar
 József Laux / drums, percussion

Releases information
 LP Qualiton Records LPX 17400 (1969 Hungary)
 CD Mega Records HCD 37585 (1992 Hungary)
 CD Hungaroton HCD 17400 (2003 Hungary) (with 5 bonus tracks 11–15)

References

10000 Lépés at Discogs
[ 10000 Lépés] at Allmusic
10000 Lépés

1969 albums
Omega (band) albums
Hungarian-language albums
Qualiton Records albums